The XXIII 2019 Pan Am Badminton Championships was a continental championships tournament of badminton in Pan America. This tournament was held as two events in different countries. From 14 to 17 February, the team event was held in Lima, Peru. From 25 to 28 April, the individual event was held in Aguascalientes, Mexico.

Tournament
The team event of 2019 Pan Am Badminton Championships officially XXIII Pan Am Mixed Team Continental Championships, was a team continental championships tournament of badminton, to crown the best mixed team in Pan America. This event was organized by the Badminton Pan Am and Federación Deportiva Peruana de Badminton. 11 teams entered the tournament.

The individual event of Pan Am Badminton Championships was an individual continental championships tournament of badminton, to crowns the best male and female players and pairs in Pan America. The ranking points of this tournament were graded as BWF World Tour Super 100 event. This event was organized by the Badminton Pan Am and Federacion Mexicana de Badminton.

Venue
The team event was held at Centro de Alto Rendimiento La Videna in Lima, Peru.
The individual event venue was held at Gimnasio Olímpico in Aguascalientes, Mexico.

Point distribution
Below is the tables with the point distribution for each phase of the individual event tournament based on the BWF points system for the Pan Am Badminton Championships.

Medalists

Medal table

Team events

Individual events

Team events

Group A

Group B

Group C

Knockout stage

1st to 6th place

7th to 9th place

10th to 11th place

Final standings

Individual event

Men's singles

Seeds

 Ygor Coelho (quarterfinals)
 Jason Ho-Shue (semifinals)
 Kevin Cordón (final)
 Osleni Guerrero (champions)
 Lino Muñoz (quarterfinals)
 Job Castillo (semifinals)
 Timothy Lam (second round)
 Artur Silva Pomoceno (quarterfinals)

Finals

Top half

Section 1

Section 2

Bottom half

Section 3

Section 4

Women's singles

Seeds

 Michelle Li (champions)
 Brittney Tam (final)
 Crystal Pan (semifinals)
 Disha Gupta (third round)
 Isabel Zhong (second round)
 Daniela Macías (second round)
 Fabiana Silva (quarterfinals)
 Jennie Gai (semifinals)

Finals

Top half

Section 1

Section 2

Bottom half

Section 3

Section 4

Men's doubles

Seeds

 Jason Ho-Shue / Nyl Yakura (champions)
 Phillip Chew / Ryan Chew (quarterfinals)
 Joshua Hurlburt-Yu / Duncan Yao (quarterfinals)
 Jonathan Solís / Rodolfo Ramírez (quarterfinals)

Finals

Top half

Section 1

Section 2

Bottom half

Section 3

Section 4

Women's doubles

Seeds

 Rachel Honderich / Kristen Tsai (champions)
 Ariel Lee / Sydney Lee (quarterfinals)

Finals

Top half

Section 1

Section 2

Bottom half

Section 3

Section 4

Mixed doubles

Seeds

 Joshua Hurlburt-Yu / Josephine Wu (champions)
 Mathew Fogarty / Isabel Zhong (second round)
 Nyl Yakura / Kristen Tsai (semifinals)
 Jonathan Solís / Diana Corleto (quarterfinals)

Finals

Top half

Section 1

Section 2

Bottom half

Section 3

Section 4

References

External links
Official website
TournamentSoftware.com: Team Results
TournamentSoftware.com: Individual Results

Pan Am Badminton Championships
Pan Am Badminton Championships
Pan Am Badminton Championships
Badminton tournaments in Peru
International sports competitions hosted by Peru
Pan Am Badminton Championships
Badminton tournaments in Mexico
International sports competitions hosted by Mexico
Pan Am Badminton Championships
Pan Am Badminton Championships